Edward Tan is a retired footballer who last played in the S.League for Woodlands Wellington FC. Known for his mercurial left foot, he was often deployed to take direct free kicks for the team. He was equally adept at playing as a left back or centre back.

Tan was part of the Tampines Rovers Prime League team from 2009 to 2011. He was released by the club in 2012 and completed his transfer as a free agent for Woodlands Wellington FC in March, impressing the media and fans alike on his debut against Gombak United just days later.

During the 2012 mid-season break, Edward decided to leave the club to pursue a normal career outside of football.

He played a total of 7 games for the Rams, coming on as a substitute in 2 of those matches.

References

Singaporean footballers
Living people
1985 births
Woodlands Wellington FC players
Tampines Rovers FC players
Singapore Premier League players
Singaporean sportspeople of Chinese descent
Association football defenders